Sema Station is a station on Seoul Subway Line 1 in the city of Osan, South Korea. Services on the Gyeongbu Line also pass through this station.

References

Seoul Metropolitan Subway stations
Railway stations opened in 2005
Metro stations in Osan